Illinois Route 185 is an east–west state road in the south-central portion of the U.S. state of Illinois. Its western terminus is in Taylor Springs at Illinois Route 127, and the eastern terminus is at Farina at Illinois Route 37.

Route description 
Illinois 185 runs geographically northwest-southeast through south-central Illinois. It overlaps both U.S. Route 40 and U.S. Route 51 through the city of Vandalia.

History 
SBI Route 185 originally ran from Bluff City to Farina. In 1949, it was extended northwest to Taylor Springs.

Major Intersections

References 

185
Transportation in Montgomery County, Illinois
Transportation in Fayette County, Illinois